The K. Radway Allen Award is the highest honour awarded by the Australian Society for Fish Biology. It recognises individuals who have made an "outstanding contribution in fish or fisheries science." The award, inaugurated in 1995, is named for New Zealand fisheries biologist Kenneth Radway Allen.

Although the process of the award is annual, it is not necessarily awarded every year. Between 1995 and 2013, the K. Radway Allen Award was given every two to four years; since 2013, it has been awarded annually. Recipients need not be a member of the Australian Society for Fish Biology, although most of their research must have been undertaken in Australia.

K. Radway Allen

Kenneth Radway Allen (1911 – 2008) was a New Zealand fisheries biologist. After a MSc from Cambridge University, Allen arrived in New Zealand and worked for many years at what was to become the Department of Scientific and Industrial Research. In 1972, he moved to Cronulla, south of Sydney, New South Wales, to become head of the CSIRO Division of Fisheries and Oceanography, where he worked until he retired.

Recipients
The K. Radway Allen Award was first awarded in 1995, to researcher Peter C. Young. As of July 2020, 14 researchers have received the honour.

See also

 List of biology awards

References

Australian science and technology awards
Biology awards
Awards established in 1995
1995 establishments in Australia